Toomas Kallaste (born 27 January 1971) is a former Estonian professional footballer.

He was born in Tallinn and played in the position of defender.  He is 1.88 m tall and weighs 77 kg. He won a total of 42 international caps for the Estonia national football team. Kallaste earned his first official cap on 1992-06-03, when Estonia played Slovenia in a friendly match.

External links
 

1971 births
Living people
Footballers from Tallinn
Estonian footballers
Estonia international footballers
FC Flora players
FC TVMK players
Nõmme Kalju FC players
Estonian expatriate footballers
Veikkausliiga players
FF Jaro players
Expatriate footballers in Finland
Estonian expatriate sportspeople in Finland
Bodens BK players
Expatriate footballers in Sweden
Estonian expatriate sportspeople in Sweden
Association football defenders